Manayaveli is a village administrative division in Trincomalee Town and Gravets in Trincomalee, Sri Lanka. As of 2005 Manyaveli consists of 1,176 families with 5,689 members.

Villages in Trincomalee District
Trincomalee Town and Gravets DS Division